Wancheng District is one of two districts of the city of Nanyang, in the southwest of Henan province, People's Republic of China.

Administrative divisions
As 2012, this district is divided to 6 subdistricts, 4 towns and 6 townships.
Subdistricts

Towns

Townships

Education

Higher education 
 Nanyang Institute of Technology()
 Henan Polytechnic Institute()

See also 
Expressways of Henan
China National Highways
Expressways of China
Henan
Wolong District
Nanyang, Henan

References

Nanyang, Henan
County-level divisions of Henan